Guam competed at the 2019 Pacific Games in Apia, Samoa from 7 to 20 July 2019. A team of 150 athletes and staff was sent to represent the territory in eleven disciplines at the games.

Athletics

Guam's athletics team was twelve strong and included two Olympians, Derek Mandell and Regine Tugade.

Men
 Paul Dimalanta: 100 m, 200 m, Long jump.
 Derek Mandell: 1500 m, 5000 m, Half-marathon.
 Benjamin Middlebrooke: 5000 m, 10,000 m, Half-marathon.
 Bleu Perez: 100 m, 200 m.

Women
 Noshista Benavente: 5000 m, 10,000 m.
 Alison Bowman: 800 m, 1500 m, 3000 m steeple chase.
 Genina Criss: 800 m, 1500 m. 
 Genie Gerardo: Shotput, Discus, Hammer throw, Javelin.
 Madison  Packbier: 200 m, 400 m, 800 m.
 Emma Sheedy: 400 m, 1500 m. 
 Regine Tugade: 100 m, 200 m, Long jump.
 Richelle Tugade: 100 m, 100m hurdles, 400m hurdles.

Basketball

Men's basketball

Nine players were selected in Guam's squad for men's basketball to defend the Pacific Games title won in 2015. JP Cruz, gold medal-winner as a member of that team, returned in 2019 and also played in the four-man squad for the 3x3 tournament.

 William Belger
 Tomas Calvo 
 JP Cruz
 Earvin Rose
 Takumi Simon
 William Stinnett (c)
 Mekeli Wesley
 Russell Wesley
 Tai Wesley

Coach: EJ Calvo

Women's basketball

Guam named 15 players in its women's team for the 2019 games:

 Brianna Benito
 Alexandra Carbullido
 Destiny Castro
 Kathryn Castro
 Kara Duenas
 Monica Giger
 Maria Mesa Nauls
 Chloe Miranda
 Joylyn Pangilinan
 Jocelyn Pardilla
 Elysia Perez
 Janniliese Quintanilla
 Mia San Nicolas
 Derin Santos

Head coach: Paul Pineda

3x3 basketball

Guam selected eight players (four male and four female) to compete in 3x3 at the 2019 games:

Men –  Final winners
 Ben Borja
 AJ Carlos
 Michael Sakazaki 
 Seve Susuico (c)

Women
 Kali Benavente
 Destiny Castro
 Joylyn Pangilinan
 Mia San Nicolas

Golf

Guam qualified eight players for the tournament in Samoa, but one member of the women's team dropped out. Seven Guam players participated in the 2019 games.

Men
 Roberto Manalo
 John Muna
 Eduardo Terlaje
 Ricardo Terlaje

Women
 Teresita Blair
 Kristin Oberiano
 Emiri Satake
 Anna-Rose Tarpley

Non-playing captain: Daryl Poe

Judo

Outrigger canoeing

Guam sent 23 athletes and two coaches to contest the various Va'a events men's and women's outrigger canoeing at the 2019 games.

Men's team

 John Aguon
 Jesse Cabrera
 Klyde Castro
 Collin Murphy
 Joseph Nowell
 Johnny Palomo
 Shane Palomo
 John Sablan
 Christopher Salas
 Matthew Savares
 Tony Vivas

Coach: David Palomo Jr

Women's team

 Ruby Castro
 Isabel Gutierrez
 Jenynne Guzman
 Jennifer Horeg
 Sue Lee
 Kai Perez
 Kiara Quichocho
 Misako Sablan
 Michele Salas
 Ashley Taitano
 Miriam Terlaje
 Diane Vice

Coach: Josh Duenas

Swimming

Six swimmers represented Guam at Samoa 2019:

Men
 Sebastian Castro
 Chrios Duenas
 Mark Imazu
 Benji Schulte 
 Jagger Stephens

Women
 Mineri Gomez

Coaches: Ed Ching and Don San Agustin

Taekwondo

Three men and two women competed for Guam in Taekwondo:

Men
 Alexander Allen
 Joseph Ho
 Leon Ho 

Women
 Tierra-Lynn Chargualaf
 Amber Toves

Coaches: Mike Ho and Ronald Cook

Tennis

The Guam Tennis Federation selected four male tennis players for the 2019 games in Samoa:

Men
 Mason Caldwell
 Camden Camacho
 Danny Llarenas
 Derek Okuhama

Triathlon

Volleyball

Men's beach volleyball

Guam qualified one men's pair for beach volleyball:

 Zakhary Zacarias
 Brian Tsujii

Women's volleyball (indoor)

Guam selected ten players for their women's volleyball team:

 Joie Blas
 Adriana Chang
 Edeline Cruz
 Hilary Diaz (c)
 Samara Duenas
 Mariana Kier
 Austia Mendiola
 Lori Okada
 Jestyne Sablan
 Tatiana Sablan

Weightlifting

Guam selected six athletes to compete in weightlifting at the 2019 games.

Men
 David Bautista, −73 kg

Women
 Armie Almazan, −64 kg
 Dayalani Calma, −45 kg
 Dayamaya Calma, −49 kg
 Dayanara Calma, −59 kg
 Jacinta Sumagaysay, −55 kg 

Coach: Edgar Molinos

References

Nations at the 2019 Pacific Games
2019